Gedi & Sons Football Club is a club based in Monrovia, Liberia. Their home stadium is the Antonette Tubman Stadium.

Current squad

(Deceased)

Football clubs in Liberia
Sport in Monrovia